Medina (and its variant Medine) is a unisex given name. People with the name include:

 Medina (singer) (born 1982), Danish singer
 Médine (rapper) (born 1983), French rapper of Algerian descent
 Medina Dixon (1962–2021), American basketball player
 Medina Warda Aulia (born 1997), Indonesian chess player

Unisex given names